The highly accelerated stress test (HAST) method was first proposed by Jeffrey E. Gunn, Sushil K. Malik, and Purabi M. Mazumdar of IBM.

The acceleration factor for elevated humidity is empirically derived to be

 is a value which normally goes from 0.1 to 0.15

where RHs is the stressed humidity, RHo is the operating-environment humidity, and n is an empirically derived constant (usually 1 < n < 5).

The acceleration factor for elevated temperature is derived to be

where Ea is the activation energy for the temperature-induced failure (most often 0.7 eV for electronics), k is the Boltzmann constant, To is the operating temperature in kelvins, and Ts is the stressed temperature.

Therefore the total acceleration factor for unbiased HAST testing is

References

External links
Highly Accelerated Stress Test Chambers
Environmental Test Chamber Selector By Application
Environmental Test Chamber Selector By Application

Reliability engineering